Tala Gray (born 28 February 1990) is an Australian Rugby Union player who currently plays as a loose forward for the Stade Francais (France) in Top 14 after a couple of games for  in Super Rugby.

Career

There he was a winner of the Amlin Challenge Cup and his performances caught the eye of his future coach Michael Cheika who signed him up for Waratahs ahead of the 2014 Super Rugby season.

International

Gray was a member of the Australia Under 20 side that competed in the 2010 IRB Junior World Championship and has also represented the Australia Sevens team.

References

External links

 Waratahs Profile

1990 births
Living people
Australian expatriate rugby union players
Australian expatriate sportspeople in France
Australia international rugby sevens players
Australian rugby union players
Biarritz Olympique players
Expatriate rugby union players in France
Male rugby sevens players
New South Wales Country Eagles players
New South Wales Waratahs players
Rugby union number eights
Rugby union players from Melbourne